Antonio Adán Garrido (born 13 May 1987) is a Spanish professional footballer who plays as a goalkeeper for Primeira Liga club Sporting CP. 

A youth product of Real Madrid, where he acted mainly as a backup, he spent most of his career with Betis. He totalled 129 La Liga matches for those two clubs, as well as Atlético Madrid for whom he signed in 2018. Abroad, he featured for Cagliari in Serie A, and won a Primeira Liga title with Sporting CP.

All youth levels comprised, Adán won 39 caps for Spain.

Club career

Real Madrid
A Real Madrid youth graduate, Madrid-born Adán was the first-choice goalkeeper for its C side in the 2005–06 season, playing 36 games and conceding 29 goals. He also started three times for the Juvenil team which won the Champions Cup of the category, keeping a clean sheet in the tournament.

The following campaign, Adán was selected for the first team's United States tour in August 2006. He served as backup to captain Jordi Codina in Real Madrid Castilla, until the latter's promotion to the main squad.

Adán made his debut in 2006–07's Segunda División on 27 August 2006, in a 1–1 away draw with CD Castellón. He appeared in six league matches as Real's reserves were eventually relegated.

After the sale of Codina to neighbours Getafe CF, Adán was promoted to the senior squad for pre-season training in the 2009–10 campaign. While still featuring mostly for the B's, he was third choice in the first team behind Iker Casillas and Jerzy Dudek.

On 8 December 2010, Adán played his first competitive game for Real Madrid, coming on as a substitute for the injured Dudek in the 44th minute of the 4–0 home win against AJ Auxerre in the group stage of the UEFA Champions League; the Merengues had already won their group, and manager José Mourinho rested several starters. The following month, he featured the full 90 minutes in a 0–2 loss at Levante UD in the round of 16 of the Copa del Rey (8–2 on aggregate).

Adán made his La Liga debut on 13 February 2011, replacing sent off Casillas in the second minute of a 1–0 away victory over RCD Espanyol. Starting in the following matchday, at home against Levante, he kept a clean sheet in a 2–0 win.

On 22 December 2012, Adán relegated longtime incumbent Casillas to the bench in a 3–2 away loss to Málaga CF; Mourinho defended his controversial decision in his post-match comments by saying: "It's a technical decision. The coach analyses the situation, looks at the players at his disposal and chooses his team. At the moment, for me and my coaching staff, Adán is better than Iker". He retained his place for the next game, being sent off in the early minutes of an eventual 4–3 home defeat of Real Sociedad after giving away a penalty.

Cagliari
On 2 September 2013, Adán left Real Madrid after his contract was terminated. On 19 November he signed with Italy's Cagliari Calcio, making his Serie A debut on 5 January of the following year in a 0–0 away draw against A.C. ChievoVerona.

Betis
On 27 January 2014, Adán terminated his link to the Sardinians and returned to his country and its top division, joining struggling Real Betis. He contributed 40 appearances in his first full season, helping his team win the second-tier championship and subsequently promote.

Adán was named team captain in August 2014, alongside Jorge Molina, Damien Perquis and Xavi Torres. The following two top-flight campaigns combined, he only missed three matches.

Atlético Madrid
Adán returned to the Spanish capital on 10 July 2018, with the 31-year-old signing a two-year contract with Atlético Madrid. Used only in domestic cup games, he did not debut in the league until the last game of the season when he stood in for the injured Jan Oblak for a 2–2 draw at Levante UD on 18 May 2019.

Sporting CP
On 20 August 2020, Adán moved to Portuguese club Sporting CP on a free transfer, for two years with the option of a third. He was a key player as they won their first Primeira Liga title for 19 years, keeping 20 clean sheets and conceding just 19 goals in 32 matches.

International career
In July 2006, Adán captained the Spain under-19 team all the way to winning the UEFA European Championship alongside four other Real Madrid products: Alberto Bueno, Javi García, Esteban Granero and Juan Mata.

He was subsequently called up to the under-21 squad for the 2007 European Championship play-off against Italy in October 2006, but was benched – Spain lost 1–2 on aggregate. He made his first and only appearance at that level on 6 February 2007, in a 2–2 friendly draw with England held at Pride Park Stadium.

Career statistics

Honours
Real Madrid
La Liga: 2011–12
Copa del Rey: 2010–11
Supercopa de España: 2012

Betis
Segunda División: 2014–15

Atlético Madrid
UEFA Super Cup: 2018

Sporting CP
Primeira Liga: 2020–21
Taça da Liga: 2020–21, 2021–22
Supertaça Cândido de Oliveira: 2021

Spain U19
UEFA European Under-19 Championship: 2006

Individual
Primeira Liga Goalkeeper of the Month: December 2020, January 2021, February 2021, April 2021, August 2021, October/November 2021
Primeira Liga Team of the Year: 2020–21

References

External links

1987 births
Living people
Spanish footballers
Footballers from Madrid
Association football goalkeepers
La Liga players
Segunda División players
Segunda División B players
Tercera División players
Real Madrid C footballers
Real Madrid Castilla footballers
Real Madrid CF players
Real Betis players
Atlético Madrid footballers
Serie A players
Cagliari Calcio players
Primeira Liga players
Sporting CP footballers
Spain youth international footballers
Spain under-21 international footballers
Spanish expatriate footballers
Expatriate footballers in Italy
Expatriate footballers in Portugal
Spanish expatriate sportspeople in Italy
Spanish expatriate sportspeople in Portugal